Hoplistopus butti is a moth of the family Sphingidae. It is known from South Africa and Namibia.

It is very similar to Hoplistopus penricei, but the body and wings are whitish grey and much paler. The forewing upperside has a black line in the discal cell, and one or more black lines on the disc between the veins. There is an oblique, black, apical stripe and two parallel, weakly marked S-shaped discal lines, followed distally with a linear patch representing a third line near the hind margin.

References

Sphingini
Moths described in 1903